Vöcklabrucker SC is an Austrian association football club from Vöcklabruck, who currently plays in the 8th tier Upper Austria 2. Klasse Mitte West.

History
After the dissolution of the 1. FC Vöcklabruck and the relegation from the First Division to the regional league. The city has on Hausruck founded a new club, the Vöcklabrucker SC start in the 2nd Klasse Mitte/West. Class mid-west.

Current squad
www.vbsc.at

References

External links
Official site

Football clubs in Austria
Association football clubs established in 2009
2009 establishments in Austria